Hädrich may refer to:

Places
 Mount Hädrich, mountain of Queen Maud Land

People
 Rolf Hädrich (1931–2000), German film director and screenwriter